Tommy Haas was the defending champion but lost in the semifinals to Paradorn Srichaphan.

Srichaphan won in the final 5–7, 6–2, 6–2 against Juan Ignacio Chela.

Seeds
A champion seed is indicated in bold text while text in italics indicates the round in which that seed was eliminated. All sixteen seeds received a bye to the second round.

  Tommy Haas (semifinals)
  Roger Federer (second round)
  Pete Sampras (second round)
  Younes El Aynaoui (quarterfinals)
  Àlex Corretja (semifinals)
  Rainer Schüttler (second round)
  Juan Ignacio Chela (final)
  Nicolás Lapentti (second round)
 n/a
  Mariano Zabaleta (second round)
  Jarkko Nieminen (quarterfinals)
  Stefan Koubek (second round)
 n/a
  Arnaud Clément (third round)
  Fabrice Santoro (second round)
  Agustín Calleri (third round)
  Jonas Björkman (third round)

Draw

Finals

Top half

Section 1

Section 2

Bottom half

Section 3

Section 4

External links
 ATP main draw
 ATP qualifying draw

Connecticut Open (tennis)
2002 ATP Tour